Antonio "Nino" Bianco (26 December 1951 – 15 June 2009) was a South African scientist of Italian ancestry.

Bianco, who was born into a family of gemstone cutters, moved to the United States in 1976. He was especially well known for cutting large diamonds, including a significant number of stones weighing more than  when cut, including the "Dream Diamond", a  fancy colored yellow diamond he produced for the Graff diamond company in 2006, with estimated value at the time of £13 million.

Bianco died of cancer on 15 June 2009.

References

Diamond cutting
1951 births
2009 deaths
Deaths from cancer in South Africa
South African emigrants to the United States
South African people of Italian descent